Náutico Futebol Clube, commonly referred to as Náutico de Roraima, Náutico-RR or simply Náutico is a Brazilian professional club based in Boa Vista, Roraima founded on 22 December 1962. It competes in the Campeonato Brasileiro Série D, the fourth tier of Brazilian football, as well as in the Campeonato Roraimense, the top flight of the Roraima state football league.

History
The club was founded on December 22, 1962. Náutico finished as runners-up in the Campeonato Roraimense in 2010, and one of its players, named Robemar was one of the two top goal scorers of the competition. They competed in the Série D in 2012, when they were eliminated in the First Stage of the competition. Náutico won the Campeonato Roraimense after beating São Raimundo in the final. The club is competing in the 2013 Série D.

Honours
 Campeonato Roraimense
 Winners (3): 1968, 2013, 2015

Stadium
Náutico Futebol Clube play their home games at Estádio Flamarion Vasconcelos, nicknamed Canarinho. The stadium has a maximum capacity of 6,000 people.

References

Football clubs in Roraima
Association football clubs established in 1962
1962 establishments in Brazil